Banco Patagonia is an Argentine commercial bank headquartered in Buenos Aires. The company operates in the individual, as well as small and medium-sized business banking segments, and has currently more than 775,000 clients.

Banco Patagonia was established as a brokerage house in 1976. Following its entry into the auto loan sector in 1987, it became a commercial bank (Banco Mildesa) in 1988. Mildes grew with the 1996 acquisition of the newly privatized Banco de Río Negro, and was renamed after the latter province's region of Patagonia, in 2000.

Patagonia acquired the insolvent Banco Sudameris (whose portfolio included the Caja de Ahorro, the nation's largest savings and loan), in 2003. Absorbing Lloyds TSB's Argentine operations in 2004, it grew to become one of the 15 largest banks in Argentina, and has branches in Brazil and Uruguay. Banco Patagonia is listed on the Buenos Aires Stock Exchange and already been listed on the BM&F Bovespa, in São Paulo.

It is owned by Banco do Brasil, the second largest bank in Latin America. Banco do Brasil holds 58.96% of the shares of Banco Patagonia.

According to the reports in July 2019, Banco Patagonia received the Best Bank award in the 15th Edition of the Fortuna Awards for the Best and largest companies 2019.

References

External links 

Banco Patagonia: Historia 

Banks of Argentina
Banks established in 1976
Companies listed on B3 (stock exchange)
1976 establishments in Argentina
Argentine subsidiaries of foreign companies